Christ Church Cathedral in Nashville, Tennessee, is the cathedral church of the Episcopal Diocese of Tennessee in the Episcopal Church in the United States of America. The congregation was founded in 1829 and became the diocesan cathedral, by designation, in 1997.

Music and liturgies
The Cathedral Choir at Christ Church has been recognized by the Nashville Scene for several years running as the "Best Church Music" in Nashville.  The 32-piece choir is currently directed by Michael Velting and performs weekly liturgies at the 11:00 services as well as other services throughout the year.

In addition to four Sunday liturgies, the Cathedral maintains a rhythm of daily Morning Prayer and daily celebrations of the Holy Eucharist. Other special liturgies of the Cathedral that happen throughout the year include Choral Evensong (usually with Benediction of the Blessed Sacrament), the Feast of St. Francis and blessing of animals, and the Feast of St. Nicholas.

See also
List of the Episcopal cathedrals of the United States
List of cathedrals in the United States

References

External links
Christ Church Cathedral website
Episcopal Diocese of Tennessee

Christ Church Cathedral
Christ Church Nashville
Episcopal churches in Tennessee
Churches completed in 1894